Dennis W. Parmenter (December 27, 1950 – December 12, 2020) was an American politician and lawyer.

Parmenter was born in Elkhart, Iowa to parents Paul Parmenter and Kathryn, née Ault. After his mother died, his father remarried, to Sandra Sorenson. Dennis Parmenter attended North Polk High School, Iowa State University, and the Drake University School of Law. He married Kathy Houge in October 1970, with whom he had three children. Parmenter was an Assistant Story County Attorney, and in 1979, established his legal practice in Huxley.

Parmenter previously served as mayor of Huxley. A Democrat, he was a member of the Iowa House of Representatives from 1999 to 2001 (62nd district).

He died on December 12, 2020, in Des Moines. Parmenter's memorial service was held in June 2021.

References

1950 births
2020 deaths
People from Polk County, Iowa
Iowa lawyers
Democratic Party members of the Iowa House of Representatives
Mayors of places in Iowa
20th-century American lawyers
21st-century American politicians
20th-century American politicians